Changing of the Seasons is the fourth studio album by Norwegian singer-songwriter Ane Brun, released on 12 March 2008 in Norway and Sweden, 14 October 2008 in the US, and on 2 February 2009 in the UK. The album became her breakthrough record outside of Scandinavia when the bonus track "True Colors", a cover of the 1985 Cyndi Lauper song, was used in a television advertisement for Sky+ HD in the United Kingdom and Ireland. The other bonus track is a cover of Alphaville's 1984 hit single "Big in Japan", recorded as part of the soundtrack for the Swedish  TV documentary programme Stor i Japan. The version of the album with the two bonus tracks was released in Europe on 7 December 2008 and in the UK in February 2009. The French release of the album on 12 October 2009 contained a third bonus track, a version in French of "Koop Island Blues", a song Brun originally recorded in 2006 with Swedish jazz group Koop.

The album debuted at No. 1 in Norway and at No. 2 in Sweden.

Track listing

Bonus tracks

French bonus tracks

Charts

Weekly charts

Year-end charts

References

External links
 Official web site

2008 albums
Albums produced by Valgeir Sigurðsson
Ane Brun albums